Maksim Leanidavich Lynsha (born 6 April 1985 in Hancavičy) is a Belarusian athlete specializing in the 110 meters hurdles.

Competition record

Personal bests
Outdoors
100m – 10.62 (-1.5 m/s) (Grodno 2008)
200m – 21.16 (+1.1 m/s) (Prague 2006)
110m hurdles – 13.36 (+0.3 m/s) (Albi 2012)

Indoors
60m – 6.60 (Mogilev 2008)
200m – 21.59 (Mogilev 2006)
60m hurdles – 7.58 (Gothenburg 2013)

External links
 

1985 births
Living people
Belarusian male hurdlers
Athletes (track and field) at the 2008 Summer Olympics
Athletes (track and field) at the 2012 Summer Olympics
Olympic athletes of Belarus
People from Hantsavichy District
Sportspeople from Brest Region